Yaroslav the Wise or Yaroslav I Vladimirovich was the Grand Prince of Kiev from 1019 until his death. He was also the Prince of Novgorod on three occasions, uniting the principalities for a time. Yaroslav's baptismal name was George after Saint George.

Rise to the throne

The early years of Yaroslav's life are mostly unknown. He was one of the numerous sons of Vladimir the Great, presumably his second by Rogneda of Polotsk, although his actual age (as stated in the Primary Chronicle and corroborated by the examination of his skeleton in the 1930s) would place him among the youngest children of Vladimir.

It has been suggested that he was a child begotten out of wedlock after Vladimir's divorce from Rogneda and marriage to Anna Porphyrogenita, or even that he was a child of Anna Porphyrogenita herself. French historian Jean-Pierre Arrignon argues that he was indeed Anna's son, as this would explain his interference in Byzantine affairs in 1043. 

Furthermore, Yaroslav's maternity by Rogneda of Polotsk has been questioned since Mykola Kostomarov in the 19th century. Yaroslav figures prominently in the Norse sagas under the name Jarisleif the Lame; his legendary lameness (probably resulting from an arrow wound) was corroborated by the scientists who examined his remains.

In his youth, Yaroslav was sent by his father to rule the northern lands around Rostov. He was transferred to Veliky Novgorod, as befitted a senior heir to the throne, in 1010. While living there, he founded the town of Yaroslavl (literally, "Yaroslav's") on the Volga River. His relations with his father were apparently strained, and grew only worse on the news that Vladimir bequeathed the Kievan throne to his younger son, Boris. In 1014 Yaroslav refused to pay tribute to Kiev and only Vladimir's death, in July 1015, prevented a war.

During the next four years Yaroslav waged a complicated and bloody war for Kiev against his half-brother Sviatopolk I of Kiev, who was supported by his father-in-law, Duke Bolesław I the Brave (King of Poland from 1025). During the course of this struggle, several other brothers (Boris, Gleb, and Svyatoslav) were brutally murdered. The Primary Chronicle accused Sviatopolk of planning those murders. The saga  is often interpreted as recounting the story of Boris' assassination by the Varangians in the service of Yaroslav. 

However, the victim's name is given there as Burizaf, which is also a name of Boleslaus I in the Scandinavian sources. It is thus possible that the Saga tells the story of Yaroslav's struggle against Sviatopolk (whose troops were commanded by the Polish duke), and not against Boris.

Yaroslav defeated Sviatopolk in their first battle, in 1016, and Sviatopolk fled to Poland. Sviatopolk returned in 1018 with Polish troops furnished by his father-in-law, seized Kiev, and pushed Yaroslav back into Novgorod. Yaroslav prevailed over Sviatopolk, and in 1019 firmly established his rule over Kiev. One of his first actions as a grand prince was to confer on the loyal Novgorodians, who had helped him to gain the Kievan throne, numerous freedoms and privileges. 

Thus, the foundation of the Novgorod Republic was laid. For their part, the Novgorodians respected Yaroslav more than they did other Kievan princes; and the princely residence in their city, next to the marketplace (and where the  often convened) was named Yaroslav's Court after him.

Reign

Power struggles between siblings
Leaving aside the legitimacy of Yaroslav's claims to the Kievan throne and his postulated guilt in the murder of his brothers, Nestor the Chronicler and later Ukrainian historians often presented him as a model of virtue, styling him "the Wise".  A less appealing side of his personality is revealed by his having imprisoned his youngest brother Sudislav for life. In response, another brother, Mstislav of Chernigov, whose distant realm bordered the North Caucasus and the Black Sea, hastened to Kiev. 

Despite reinforcements led by Yaroslav's brother-in-law King Anund Jacob of Sweden (as Yakun - "blind and dressed in a gold suit" or "handsome and dressed in a gold suit") Mstislav inflicted a heavy defeat on Yaroslav in 1024. Yaroslav and Mstislav then divided Kievan Rus' between them: the area stretched east from the Dnieper River, with the capital at Chernigov, was ceded to Mstislav until his death in 1036.

Allies along the Baltic coast
In his foreign policy, Yaroslav relied on a Scandinavian alliance and attempted to weaken the Byzantine influence on Kiev. According to Heimskringla, Olaf the Swede made an alliance with Yaroslav, even though the alliance was not liked in Sweden, in order to declare war against Olaf II of Norway. . This was sealed in 1019 when King Olof of Sweden married his daughter to Yaroslav instead of the Norwegian king. That led to protests in Sweden because the Swedes wanted to reestablish control over their lost eastern territories and bring in tribute from Kievan Rus', as his father Eric the Victorious had, but after years of war against Norway, Sweden no longer had the power to collect regular tributes from Kievan Rus', according to Heimskringla. In 1022 Olaf was deposed and forced to give power to his son Anund Jakob.

He manfully defended the Eastern countries from invaders, ensuring Swedish military interests. 

In a successful military raid in 1030, he captured Tartu, Estonia and renamed it Yuryev (named after Yury, Yaroslav's patron saint) and forced the surrounding Ugandi County to pay annual tribute. 

In 1031, he conquered Cherven cities from the Poles followed by the construction of Sutiejsk to guard the newly acquired lands. In c.1034 Yaroslav concluded an alliance with Polish King Casimir I the Restorer, sealed by the latter's marriage to Yaroslav's sister, Maria. 

Later in Yaroslav's reign, around c.1035, Ingvar the Far-Travelled, Anund Jakob's jarl, sent Swedish soldiers into Kievan Rus due to Olof's son wanting to assist his father's ally Yaroslav in his wars against the Pechenegs and Byzantines. Later, in c.1041 Anund Jakob tried to reestablish Swedish control over the Eastern trade routes and reopen them. The Georgian annals report 1000 men coming into Georgia but the original force was likely much larger, around 3,000 men.

Ingvar's fate is unknown, but he was likely captured in battle during the Byzantine campaigns or killed, supposedly in 1041. Only one ship returned to Sweden, according to the legend.

Campaign against Byzantium

Yaroslav presented his second direct challenge to Constantinople in 1043, when a Rus' flotilla headed by one of his sons appeared near Constantinople and demanded money, threatening to attack the city otherwise. Whatever the reason, the Greeks refused to pay and preferred to fight. The Rus' flotilla defeated the Byzantine fleet but was almost destroyed by a storm and came back to Kiev empty-handed.

Protecting the inhabitants of the Dnieper from the Pechenegs

To defend his state from the Pechenegs and other nomadic tribes threatening it from the south he constructed a line of forts, composed of Yuriev, Bohuslav, Kaniv, Korsun, and Pereyaslavl. To celebrate his decisive victory over the Pechenegs in 1036, who thereafter were never a threat to Kiev, he sponsored the construction of the Saint Sophia Cathedral in 1037. 

In 1037 the monasteries of Saint George and Saint Irene were built, named after patron saints of Yaroslav and his wife. Some mentioned and other celebrated monuments of his reign such as the Golden Gate of Kiev were destroyed during the Mongol invasion of Rus', but later restored.

Establishment of law
Yaroslav was a notable patron of literary culture and learning. In 1051, he had a Slavic monk, Hilarion of Kiev, proclaimed the metropolitan bishop of Kiev, thus challenging the Byzantine tradition of placing Greeks on the episcopal sees. Hilarion's discourse on Yaroslav and his father Vladimir is frequently cited as the first work of Old East Slavic literature.

Family life and posterity
In 1019, Yaroslav married Ingegerd Olofsdotter, daughter of Olof Skötkonung, the king of Sweden. He gave Staraya Ladoga to her as a marriage gift.

Saint Sophia's Cathedral in Kiev houses a fresco representing the whole family: Yaroslav, Irene (as Ingegerd was known in Rus'), their four daughters and six sons. Yaroslav had at least three of his daughters married to foreign princes who lived in exile at his court:
 Elisiv of Kiev to Harald Harðráði (who attained her hand by his military exploits in the Byzantine Empire);
 Anastasia of Kiev to the future Andrew I of Hungary;
 Anne of Kiev married Henry I of France and was the regent of France during their son's minority (she was Yaroslav the Wise's most beloved daughter);
 (possibly) Agatha, wife of Edward the Exile, of the royal family of England, the mother of Edgar the Ætheling and Saint Margaret of Scotland.

Yaroslav had one son from the first marriage (his Christian name being Ilya (?–1020)), and six sons from the second marriage. Apprehending the danger that could ensue from divisions between brothers, he exhorted them to live in peace with each other. The eldest of these, Vladimir of Novgorod, best remembered for building the Cathedral of St. Sophia, Novgorod, predeceased his father. 

Three other sons—Iziaslav I, Sviatoslav II, and Vsevolod I—reigned in Kiev one after another. The youngest children of Yaroslav were Igor Yaroslavich (1036–1060) of Volhynia and Vyacheslav Yaroslavich (1036–1057) of the Principality of Smolensk. There is almost no information about Vyacheslav. Some documents point out the fact of him having a son, Boris Vyacheslavich, who challenged Vsevolod I sometime in 1077–1078.

Grave

Following his death, the body of Yaroslav the Wise was entombed in a white marble sarcophagus within Saint Sophia's Cathedral. In 1936, the sarcophagus was opened and found to contain the skeletal remains of two individuals, one male and one female. The male was determined to be Yaroslav. The identity of the female was never established. The sarcophagus was again opened in 1939 and the remains removed for research, not being documented as returned until 1964.

In 2009, the sarcophagus was opened and surprisingly found to contain only one skeleton, that of a female. It seems the documents detailing the 1964 reinterment of the remains were falsified to hide the fact that Yaroslav's remains had been lost. Subsequent questioning of individuals involved in the research and reinterment of the remains seems to point to the idea that Yaroslav's remains were purposely hidden prior to the German occupation of Ukraine and then either lost completely or stolen and transported to the United States where many ancient religious artifacts were placed to avoid "mistreatment" by the communists.

Legacy
Four towns in four countries were named after Yaroslav, three of which he also founded: Yaroslavl (in today's Russia), Jarosław in Poland, Yuryev (now Bila Tserkva, Ukraine), and another Yuryev in place of conquered Tarbatu (now Tartu) between 1030 and 1061 in Estonia. Following the Russian custom of naming military objects such as tanks and planes after historical figures, the helmet worn by many Russian soldiers during the Crimean War was called the "Helmet of Yaroslav the Wise". It was the first pointed helmet to be used by a modern army, even before German troops wore pointed helmets.

In 2008 Yaroslav was placed first (with 40% of the votes) in their ranking of "our greatest compatriots" by the viewers of the TV  show . Afterwards, one of the producers of The Greatest Ukrainians claimed that Yaroslav had only won because of vote manipulation and that (if that had been prevented) the real first place would have been awarded to Stepan Bandera.

In 2003, a monument to Yaroslav the Wise was erected in Kyiv, Ukraine. The creators of the monument are Boris Krylov and Oles Sydoruk. There is also a Yaroslavska Street in Kiev, and there are various streets named after him in cities throughout Ukraine. 

The Yaroslav Mudryi National Law University in Kharkiv is named after him.

Iron Lord was a 2010 feature film based on Yaroslav's early life as a regional prince on the frontier.

On December 12, 2022, on the Constitution Day of the Russian Federation, a monument to Yaroslav the Wise was unveiled at the site near the Novgorod Technical School. The author of the monument is sculptor Sergey Gaev.

Veneration 

Yaroslav was at the earliest named a saint by Adam of Bremen in his "Deeds of Bishops of the Hamburg Church" in 1075, but he was not formally canonized. On 9 March 2004 on his 950th death anniversary he was added to calendar of saints of Ukrainian Orthodox Church (Moscow Patriarchate). On 8 December 2005 Patriarch Alexy II of Moscow added his name to Menologium as a local Ukrainian saint. On 3 February 2016, Bishops' Council of the Russian Orthodox Church held in Moscow allowed to establish his cult in the whole of the Russian Orthodox Church.

See also
 List of Ukrainian rulers

Notes

References

Bibliography

External links

 Akathist to Saint Yaroslav
 Yaroslav the Wise’s Contested Legacy, A Visual Timeline; Wall Street Journal. Retrieved December 10, 2022.

Medieval legislators
Eastern Orthodox monarchs
Grand Princes of Kiev
Rurik dynasty
Princes of Novgorod
970s births
1054 deaths
Year of birth uncertain
10th-century princes in Kievan Rus'
11th-century princes in Kievan Rus'
Eastern Orthodox royal saints
Burials at Saint Sophia Cathedral, Kyiv
Children of Vladimir the Great
Eastern Orthodox saints
Christian monarchs
Military saints
Christian royal saints
11th-century Christian saints
Kievan Khagans